CRTX may refer to:

 crtX, the gene for the enzyme zeaxanthin glucosyltransferase
 Chemoradiotherapy, the combination of chemotherapy and radiotherapy to treat cancer
Cortexyme, a biopharmaceutical company working on developing treatments for neurodegenerative diseases
.crtx, a file extension